Orchardleigh (also spelled Orchardlea) is a country estate in Somerset, approximately two miles north of Frome, and on the southern edge of the village of Lullington. The privately held estate comprises a Victorian country house, the Orchardleigh Lake with its island church, and an 18-hole golf course.

Orchardleigh is available for weddings and other events. Various accommodation is provided, both in the house itself and at adjacent lodges and cottages in the extensive grounds.

Within the old estate are the Orchardleigh Stones, a probable neolithic burial chamber which was excavated in 1803 and 1804, when human bones and cremation urns were discovered.

The Church of St Mary, Orchardlea, dates from the 13th century and is Grade I listed. The churchyard contains the grave of the poet Sir Henry Newbolt. The Gloucester Lodge gatehouse was built in the early 19th century.

The parish was part of the hundred of Frome.

The old Orchardleigh House was just south of the church.  Its heyday was the time of Sir Thomas Champneys, 1st Baronet, High Sheriff of Somerset in 1775, but all that remains of that period is the boathouse, rotunda, the Lullington gateway, and the Tudor lodges dating from the 1820s.  The old house was demolished and the present one built in 1856 by Thomas Henry Wyatt for William Duckworth. The new house is described by Pevsner as "picturesque, irregular, and in a mixed Elizabethan style", and is a Grade II* listed building.

The estate is listed at grade II* on the Register of Parks and Gardens of Special Historic Interest in England.

The Duckworth family

William Duckworth (1795–1876) bought the Orchardleigh estate in 1855 and built the house in 1856. He was born in 1795 in Manchester. His father was George Duckworth who was lord of the manor in Over Darwen in the parish of Blackburn. When his father died in 1815 William and his brother Samuel inherited his estates. Samuel died in 1847 and as he was unmarried he also left his fortune to William. When William bought the Orchardleigh estate in 1855 he was an extremely wealthy man and was therefore able to afford the elegant house that still stands.

In 1825 he married Hester Emily Philips who was the daughter of Robert Philips who owned an estate in Prestwich called The Park. The couple had four sons and one daughter. Their youngest son was Herbert who in 1867 married Julia Prinsep Jackson. They are both shown in the photo on the left shortly after their marriage. The photo was taken by Leslie Stephen the author and historian who at this time was a friend of Herbert. They had become friends when students at Cambridge ten years before. Herbert died in 1870 from appendicitis and Julia was left a widow with three young children: George (1868–1934), later a senior civil servant, Stella (1869–1897) and Gerald (1870–1937), founder of Duckworth Publishing. She married Leslie Stephen in 1878 after his wife died. They had four more children one of whom was Virginia Woolf.

William died in 1876 and his son Reverend William Arthur Duckworth inherited the house. He was born in 1829 and was educated at Eton and then went to Cambridge University. In 1859 he married Edina Campbell who was the daughter of John Campbell, 1st Baron Campbell. The couple had five daughters and two sons. The eldest son Major Arthur Campbell Duckworth inherited the house when his father died in 1917. He married in 1897 Viola Davies-Evans who was the daughter of Colonel Herbert Davies-Evans.

The couple had three children one of whom was Sylvia Duckworth. In 1924 she married Major Horton Fawkes and the reception was held at Orchardleigh. The wedding which had over 600 guests was reported in numerous papers with photographs. One paper made the following comments.

The bride wore a gown of white satin boute made very simply and embroidered with long sprays of roses worked in crystal, pearl and silver beads through which was threaded a silver sash loosely knotted at the side. Her train was composed of a very beautiful Brussels lace veil lined with chiffon draped from one shoulder which had been worn at her wedding by the bride's great aunt Lady Stratheden.

When Arthur Campbell Duckworth died in 1948 his son Arthur Victor Duckworth inherited the property.

After the Duckworths

In 1986, Arthur Duckworth died, and Orchardleigh was soon sold. Work started on redevelopment, but in 1989 the developer's loans were called in by the bank and work ceased for 13 years. In 2002, a new scheme was started to build the current hotels and golf courses.

The boathouse is included in the Heritage at Risk Register produced by English Heritage. The estate also contains a bridge incorporating a sluice, a semicircular bridge, a garden house, a keepers lodge and a stables and coachhouse, which all date from the same period as the main house and are also listed buildings.

Within the grounds, which were landscaped – possibly by Humphrey Repton – and are included in the Register of Parks and Gardens of Special Historic Interest in England, is the Wood Lodge Summerhouse.

The gardens and pleasure grounds are listed, Grade II*, on the Register of Historic Parks and Gardens of special historic interest in England.

Orchardleigh has been used as a filming location, including for the 2009 TV series The Queen and the 1987 episode of Miss Marple, 4.50 from Paddington.

Using public footpaths, there is a pleasant, off-road circuit walk from Orchardleigh House or the Golf Club house around the part of the lake and estate grounds for 1.7 miles.

References

External links

Official website
Orchardleigh estate

Grade II listed buildings in Mendip District
Grade II* listed buildings in Mendip District
Grade II* listed houses in Somerset
Grade II* listed parks and gardens in Somerset
Structures on the Heritage at Risk register in Somerset
Country estates in England
Country houses in Somerset
Frome
Gardens in Somerset